is a 2016 Japanese television drama series broadcast by Nippon TV. It received a viewership rating of 12.9% on average.

Plot
34-year old Reiji Samejima is the successor of a traditional Japanese inn and a company president who has expanded the business into the hotel industry. Despite his good appearance and wealth, women eventually leave him because of his arrogant and childish personality. He is generous with himself, but strict with others. For the first time, Reiji falls in love with someone. Her name is Misaki Shibayama, an outspoken employee at Samejima Hotels who is not afraid to say what's on her mind. He begins to change as he pursues her with numerous romantic tactics over the course of the story with the help of his secretary Maiko Muraoki and chauffeur Katsunori Ishigami, hoping to eventually gain her love.

Cast
 Satoshi Ohno as Reiji Samejima
 Haru as Misaki Shibayama
 Eiko Koike as Maiko Muraoki
 Kazuki Kitamura as Hideo Wada
 Tetta Sugimoto as Katsunori Ishigami
 Fumika Shimizu as Mahiro Hori
 Nozomu Kotaki as Ieyasu Miura
 Hiroki Miyake as Shizuo Otonashi
 Tomomi Maruyama as Goro Shirahama
 Kota Fudauchi as Sasahiro Matsukawa
 Makoto Wakabayashi as Jun Maruto
 Ryo Nishihiro as Taiyo Hiruma

Episodes

References

External links
  
 

Japanese drama television series
2016 Japanese television series debuts
2016 Japanese television series endings
Nippon TV dramas
Television shows set in Yokohama